The 1991 Asian Women's Volleyball Championship was the sixth edition of the Asian Championship, a biennial international volleyball tournament organised by the Asian Volleyball Confederation (AVC) with Thailand Volleyball Association (TVA). The tournament was held in Bangkok, Thailand from 14 to 21 September 1991.

Preliminary round 

|}

|}

Quarter-finals 
 The results and the points of the matches between the same teams that were already played during the preliminary round shall be taken into account for the Quarter-finals.

Pool E

|}

Pool F

|}

|}

Final round

Classification 5th–8th

|}

|}

Championship

|}

|}

Final standing

References
Results (Archived 2009-05-08)

International volleyball competitions hosted by Thailand
1991 in women's volleyball
1991
Volleyball,Asian Women's Championship